Sō Percussion is an American percussion quartet formed in 1999 and based in New York City.

Composed of Josh Quillen, Adam Sliwinski, Jason Treuting, and Eric Cha-Beach, the group is well known for recording and touring internationally and for their work with composers such as Steve Reich, David Lang, Caroline Shaw, Bryce Dessner, Julia Wolfe, Vijay Iyer, Fred Frith, Angélica Negrón, Nathalie Joachim, Dan Trueman, Tristan Perich, Paul Lansky, Steven Mackey, Shara Nova, Martin Bresnick, Oscar Bettison, Evan Ziporyn, and Arvo Pärt. Originally formed when the members were students of Robert van Sice at the Yale School of Music, the group also continues to play works from the standard repertoire of percussion ensemble music—including works by composers such as John Cage, Julius Eastman, Pauline Oliveros, George Crumb, and Iannis Xenakis. In addition to their work with composers, the members of Sō Percussion produce original music, including large scale evening-length works.

The group is also known for their use of non-standard instruments and found sounds in performance and on recordings, such as scrap metal, rocks, flower pots, and an amplified cactus.

Sō Percussion has released albums on Cantaloupe Music, Nonesuch Records, Thrill Jockey, Brassland Records, and New Amsterdam Records. The group endorses Zildjian, Vic Firth, Remo and Pearl/Adams.

Naming

The group's name was suggested by Jenise Treuting, Jason Treuting's sister.

Jenise writes,

Collaborations
Sō Percussion frequently collaborates with other musicians and performers from around the world, including The National (appearing on Grammy-winning album 'Sleep Well Beast'), Buke and Gase, Shara Nova, Dave Douglas, Matmos, Medeski Martin & Wood, Dan Deacon, The Dirty Projectors, Glenn Kotche, Bobby Previte, Kid Millions/Man Forever, Eli Keszler, Emily Johnson, Ain Gordon, Shen Wei, and The Princeton Laptop Orchestra.  Recent collaborative projects include the creation with Jad Abumrad of a score to the Radiolab story "The Heartbeat," part of the episode "Radiolab Live: Telltale Hearts featuring Oliver Sacks," produced by Molly Webster and performed live by Sō Percussion at Brooklyn Academy of Music's "RadioLoveFest.".  So Percussion worked with composer West Dylan Thordson as contributing performers on the score of The Jinx: The Life and Deaths of Robert Durst, a 2015 HBO documentary miniseries about Robert Durst.

Discography
 Sō Percussion (2004)
 Steve Reich: Drumming (2005)
 Amid the Noise (2006) *CD/DVD
 Five (and-a-half) Gardens — with Trollstilt (2007)
 Treasure State — with Matmos (2010)
 Paul Lansky: Threads (2011)
 Steve Reich: WTC 9/11 - Mallet Quartet Recording (2011) *CD/DVD
 Steve Mackey: It Is Time (2011) *CD/DVD
 Martin Bresnick: Caprichos Enfaticos with Lisa Moore, piano (2011)
 Bad Mango with Dave Douglas, trumpet (2011)
 David Lang: The Woodmans - Music From the Film (2011)
 Amid the Noise Remixes (2011)
 Cage 100: Bootleg Series (2012)
 Where (we) Live (2012)
 neither Anvil nor Pulley (2013)
 Cenk Ergun: Nana - Proximity Recording (2014)
 Man Forever: Ryonen (2014)
 Bobby Previte: TERMINALS (2014)
 Bryce Dessner: Music for Wood and Strings (2015)
 Glenn Kotche: Drumkit Quartets (2016)
 Steve Reich and So Percussion: Drumming Live (2017)
 Color Theory, with PRISM Sax Quartet (2017)
 Dan Trueman: Songs That Are Hard to Sing - with JACK Quartet (2019)
 A Record Of... - with Buke and Gase (2021)
 Caroline Shaw: Narrow Sea - with Dawn Upshaw and Gil Kalish (2021)
 Julius Eastman: Stay On It - with MEDIAQUEER, Adam Tendler, Beth Meyers, Grey Mcmurray, Shelley Washington & Alex Sopp (2021)
 Paul Lansky: Angles (2021)
 Steve Reich with NEXUS Percussion (2021)
 Let The Soil Play Its Simple Part - with Caroline Shaw (2021)
 Julia Wolfe: Forbidden Love (2022)
 Individuate - With Darian Thomas, Bergamot Quartet, Shelby Blezinger-McCay, and Kasey Blezinger (2022)

Education 
Princeton University
Since 2014, the members of Sō Percussion have served as the Edward T. Cone performers-in-residence at Princeton University.  The group has commissioned and recorded major works from Princeton composition faculty Steven Mackey, Paul Lansky, and Dan Trueman, as well as collaborating many times with the Princeton Sound Kitchen and Princeton Laptop Orchestra (PLOrk).

Sō Percussion Summer Institute
The annual Sō Percussion Summer Institute (SōSI), founded in 2009, also takes place on Princeton's campus. The program features teaching and performing with the members of Sō Percussion and with Princeton faculty and student composers.  Each year includes a number of concerts on Princeton's campus, in New York, outdoors in downtown Princeton, and in Small World coffee shop.

Bard College Conservatory
Since 2011, members of Sō Percussion have served as co-directors of the percussion department at the Bard College Conservatory of Music.  The program is a five-year double degree.  Additional guest faculty for the program include Jan Williams, Garry Kvistad, Tzong-Chin Ju, Greg Zuber, Daniel Druckman, and Jonathan Haas.

Original music 
From Out a Darker Sea (2017)
From Out a Darker Sea explores the former coal mining communities of East Durham, UK in a collaboration with Forma Arts and Amber Films.

A Gun Show (2016)
A Gun Show is an exploration of American gun culture using music, video, spoken text, and movement. The project was created collaboratively by the members of Sō Percussion together with director Ain Gordon and choreographer Emily Johnson.

Where (we) Live (2013)
Where (we) Live was an original project exploring ideas about home and community, created together with guitarist Grey mcmurray, director Ain Gordon, choreographer Emily Johnson, and video designer Martin Schmidt.

2wice - Fifth Wall (2012)
Members of Sō Percussion composed the score for 'Fifth Wall' - an iPad-based performance by dancer Jonah Bokaer, published by dance magazine 2wice.

Shen Wei - Undivided/Divided (2011)
The members of Sō Percussion composed the music for Undivided/Divided with choreographer Shen Wei, which premiered at the Park Avenue Armory in November, 2011.

Martin Kersels: 5 Songs (2010)
In 2010 the Whitney Museum commissioned the members of Sō Percussion to write new original music for performance in connection with Martin Kersels' sculpture project for the Whitney Biennial: 5 Songs.

Imaginary City (2009)
Inspired by the Italo Calvino novel Invisible Cities, Imaginary City used as inspiration the six cities that are home to the presenters that commissioned it: The Brooklyn Academy of Music in Brooklyn, NY; The Myrna Loy Center in Helena, MT; The Cleveland Museum of Art in Cleveland, OH; The Flynn Center in Burlington, VT; Diverseworks Art Space in Houston, TX; and The Newman Center in Denver, CO.  The project again included original video created by Jenise Treuting as well as theatrical direction by Rinde Eckert.

Music for Trains (2008)
In 2008 Sō Percussion developed the Music for Trains project in southern Vermont. The month-long residency project centered around performances in and around the towns of Brattleboro and Bellows Falls, including concerts in the train stations of those two towns, pre-recorded mp3 players listened to on the trains, and materials gathered from the local community. The project also included original video created by Jenise Treuting and an on-stage sculpture created by local artist Ahren Ahrenholz.

Amid the Noise (2006)
A series of short pieces written by group member Jason Treuting, Amid the Noise was the first project of original music created and recorded by members of Sō Percussion.  The project also features videos created by video artist Jenise Treuting, which were included in the CD/DVD release of 2006.

Awards 
 Bessie Award for Outstanding Musical Composition/Sound Design - 2016
 American Music Center Trailblazer Award - 2011
 Chamber Music America/ASCAP Award for Adventurous Programming - 2004, 2006, 2010
 ASCAP John Cage Award - 2009
 International Percussion Competition Luxembourg 2nd Place - 2005

Selected works commissioned
 Dennis DeSantis: Shifty (2000)
 David Lang: the so-called laws of nature (2002)
 Paul Lansky: Threads (2006)
 Martin Bresnick: Caprichos Enfaticos (2007)
 Steve Mackey: It Is Time (2010)
 Dan Trueman: neither anvil nor pulley (2010)
 Steve Reich: Mallet Quartet (2010)
 Bobby Previte: Terminals (2011)
 Dan Deacon: Ghostbuster Cook: The Origin of the Riddler (2011)
 Glenn Kotche: Drumkit Quartets (2011)
 David Lang: man made (2013)
 Bryce Dessner: Music for Wood and Strings (2013)
 Shara Nova/So Percussion: Timeline (2015)
 Paul Lansky: Springs (2016)
 Caroline Shaw: Narrow Sea (2017) with Dawn Upshaw
 Donnacha Dennehy: Broken Unison (2017)
 Dan Trueman: Songs That Are Hard to Sing (2017) with JACK Quartet
 Vijay Iyer: TORQUE (2018)
 Angelica Negron: gone (2018)
 Julia Wolfe: Forbidden Love (2019)

References

External links
SoPercussion.com
Facebook Page
So Percussion on Twitter
So Percussion on Instagram
So Percussion on YouTube
Vic Firth Artist Page
Zildjian Artist Page
Alliance Artist Management Artist Page
Cantaloupe Records Artist Page
OtherARTS
So Percussion video of Steve Reich's Drumming Part 1 at the Peabody Conservatory for Aural States (Sept 2009)

So Percussion
Musical groups from Brooklyn
Nonesuch Records artists